A Cho Ban Nôi is a village in northern Laos. It is in Samphanh District in Phongsaly Province.

Populated places in Phongsaly Province